Visitors to Mauritania must obtain a visa from one of the Mauritanian diplomatic missions unless they come from one of the visa exempt countries or if they arrive at Nouakchott–Oumtounsy International Airport.

Visa policy map

Visa exemption 
Citizens of the following 8 countries can visit Mauritania without a visa for up to 90 days:

Holders of diplomatic and service passports issued to nationals of Brazil, Bulgaria, China, Egypt, Guinea-Bissau, Iran, Morocco and Turkey do not require a visa for Mauritania. Nationals of any country with a diplomatic passport except Italy do not require a visa.

Visa on arrival

Holders of passports issued by any country can obtain a visa on arrival at Nouakchott–Oumtounsy International Airport. Nationals of Syria require a prior approval from the Direction General of National Security.

See also

Visa requirements for Mauritanian citizens

References

Mauritania
Foreign relations of Mauritania